Philip Daniel Bolden (born March 19, 1995) is an American actor. In 2005, Bolden played Kevin in the film Are We There Yet?, with Ice Cube and Nia Long, and again in 2007, in its sequel film Are We Done Yet as well as Kirby on The King of Queens (1999–2000).

Biography and career
His first on-screen appearance was on King of Queens as Kirby Palmer in 1999. He appeared as "Mack Jr." in Johnson Family Vacation. Other film appearances include The Animal and Little Nicky.

On television, Bolden has guest starred on According to Jim, CSI: Miami, Malcolm in the Middle and has had recurring roles on both My Wife and Kids and The King of Queens. He also appeared in the telefilm Play'd: A Hip Hop Story. In 2001, he had a leading role in Macy Gray's music video "Sweet Baby". In 1999, he appeared in a commercial for McDonald's along with NBA's Kobe Bryant. Bolden took a decade-long hiatus from his acting after appearing in Fly Me to the Moon in 2008. But he has returned to acting, recently being cast as a main cast member in the 2021 AMC show, Millennials as Travis Lewis.

Filmography

Awards and nominations

Nomination
 2006: Young Artist Award, as the Best Young Actor in Are We There Yet?.

Won
 2007: Young Artist Award, as Best Ensemble for How to Eat Fried Worms.

References

External links
 

1995 births
African-American male actors
American male child actors
American male film actors
Place of birth missing (living people)
American male television actors
Living people
Male actors from New Orleans
21st-century African-American people